Mehari or Méhari may refer to:

Mehari (name), Amharic-language given name and surname (also Tigrigna-language) meaning merciful)
MEHARI (acronym of MEthod for Harmonized Analysis of RIsk), a free, open-source information risk analysis assessment and risk management method
 Mehari Union, a union of Kasba Upazila in the Brahmanbaria district of Bangladesh
Méhari, riding dromedaries used in Méhariste camel cavalry units
Citroën Méhari, off-road compact SUV produced 1968–1988
Citroën E-Méhari, off-road compact SUV produced 2016–2019